Aleksey Veniaminovich Kostygov (born July 5, 1973) is a Russian handball player who competed in the 2004 Summer Olympics and in the 2008 Summer Olympics.

He was born in Yaroslavl.

In 2004 he was a member of the Russian team which won the bronze medal in the Olympic tournament. He played two matches as goalkeeper.

Four years later he finished sixth with the Russian team in the 2008 Olympic tournament. He played all eight matches as goalkeeper.

References
 

1973 births
Living people
Russian male handball players
Olympic handball players of Russia
Handball players at the 2004 Summer Olympics
Handball players at the 2008 Summer Olympics
Olympic bronze medalists for Russia
Olympic medalists in handball
Medalists at the 2004 Summer Olympics
Sportspeople from Yaroslavl